The West Virginia Wesleyan Bobcats are the athletic teams that represent West Virginia Wesleyan College, located in Buckhannon, West Virginia, in NCAA Division II intercollegiate sports. The Bobcats compete as members of the Mountain East Conference for all twenty-one varsity sports.

Varsity teams

List of teams

Men's sports (9)
 Baseball
 Basketball
 Cross Country
 Football
 Golf
 Soccer
 Swimming
 Tennis
 Track and field

Women's sports (12)
 Acrobatics and tumbling
 Basketball
 Competitive Dance
 Cross Country
 Golf
 Lacrosse
 Soccer
 Softball
 Swimming
 Tennis
 Track and field
 Volleyball

Individual sports

Football
One of the earliest sporting traditions at Wesleyan was football, which was introduced in the pre-college seminary in 1898. The school colors of orange and black go back to that very first game, when fullback and team captain Frank Thompson wore a turtleneck sweater in Princeton University's orange and black to honor two football greats of that university whom he especially admired. A more comprehensive athletic program was formally organized at the collegiate level in 1902. Early sports included football, baseball, basketball, and gymnastics, all for men only.

Many WVWC alumni have gone on to play professional sports. Among them, two alumni have been inducted into the Pro Football Hall of Fame - Earl "Greasy" Neale '15 of the Philadelphia Eagles in 1969 and Cliff Battles '33 of the Washington Redskins in 1968.

National championships

Team

References

External links